No Muss...No Fuss is the fifth studio album by American rock singer Donnie Iris, released by HME in 1985.

Background
Between 1980 and 1984, Iris had released four studio albums, three of which were released through MCA Records and generated a string of moderate and minor hit singles, including the top 30 tracks "Ah! Leah!" (1981) and "My Girl" (1982). After the limited success of Fortune 410, Iris departed MCA in 1984 and signed with the independent label HME Records. In the aftermath of mainstream indifference and legal tangles with MCA, Iris released No Muss...No Fuss in 1985 through their new label. The album peaked at No. 115 on the Billboard 200, while the lead single, "Injured in the Game of Love", reached No. 91 on the Billboard Hot 100 and No. 28 on the Mainstream Rock chart. "State of the Heart" was issued as the album's second single, but as a promotional release only. "State of the Heart".

Iris did not release any further material until the 1992 album Out of the Blue. Just prior to the release of No Muss...No Fuss, the band split into different directions. Drummer Kevin Valentine and bassist Albritton McClain left to join a new group, The Innocent, and were replaced by Scott Alan Williamson on bass and Tommy Rich on drums. That same year, keyboardist Mark Avsec released a solo project under the moniker Cellarful of Noise. Even after releasing the eponymous debut album that same year, Avsec and Iris maintained that Donnie Iris and the Cruisers was still their main focus, and that they wanted to continue to release new albums with the band and its new line-up. The band returned to the studio in 1986 and recorded a new album titled Cruise Control; however, a lawsuit with the band's former label MCA resulted in the shelving of that album. It remained unreleased when the HME label went out of business, leaving Iris as an unsigned act.

In a 2008 interview with Iris, he revealed: "We had run into legal troubles with MCA. We ended up going to court over it. Actually, nothing really came of it, nobody won or lost anything, but we did lose time because I couldn't go into the studio to do any recording until that one was settled. Once it was done we were able to start recording again. That took a couple of years."

Release
The album was released in America only via HME Records, on vinyl and cassette. It soon became out-of-print, and was later digitally remastered and re-issued on CD via Primary Recordings with an alternate cover on March 20, 1999. However this was a limited CD run, released through Iris' website, and soon became a collector's item. It was digitally remastered for CD by Francisco Rodriguez at Digital Dynamics Audio Inc.

In 1992 Iris and his band released the album Out of the Blue via the Seathru label, which contained seven previously released tracks and six new songs. Of the seven previously released tracks, four were taken from the No Muss...No Fuss album; "Injured in the Game of Love", "10th Street", "Ridin' Thunder" and "I Want You Back". The appearance of these tracks was partly due to MCA demanding too much money to license many of the band's other songs.

Critical reception

Upon release, Cash Box wrote: "Tremendous effort from hit maker Iris which could break his career wide open." Billboard described the band's style as "ebullient power pop" and added: "As with earlier albums, the main suit is urgent but good-humored, melodic rock." Pete Bishop of The Pittsburgh Press described the album as a "well-produced and well-performed LP".

Scott Benarde of the Fort Lauderdale News wrote: "Iris' appeal lies in his ability to update the Phil Spector "wall of sound," infuse emotion into songs laden with synthesizers and anchor them with infectious dance rhythms. For added appeal, electric guitars and wailing vocals fly unencumbered across the techno-pop base. This is a good party or aerobic exercise record."

Rosemary O'Brien of Scene magazine commented: "On the whole, this is a good album. Iris' voice never sounded better, and the groups' harmonies are fantastic. It looks like the guy from Beaver Falls has put together a good collection of songs on this one." In a retrospective review, Bret Adams of AllMusic commented: "...it's a killer record full of absurdly high-quality arena rock and power pop. Iris' stunning vocals and the clean, melodic instrumental hooks of the band remain amazingly consistent."

Track listing

Side one
 "Injured in the Game of Love" (Avsec, Iris) – 3:26
 "10th Street" (Avsec, Iris) – 3:42
 "Ridin' Thunder" (Avsec, Iris) – 3:58
 "You're My Serenity" (Avsec, Iris) – 3:38
 "L.O.V.E." (Avsec, Iris) – 3:13

Side two
 "Follow That Car" (Avsec, Iris) – 3:54
 "Don't Cry Baby" (Gary Jones) – 3:25
 "State of the Heart" (Avsec, Iris) – 3:57
 "Headed for a Breakdown" (Avsec, Iris) – 3:22	
 "I Want You Back" (Avsec, Iris) – 3:34

Charts

Singles

Personnel
Donnie Iris and the Cruisers
 Donnie Iris - lead and background vocals, guitar  	
 Mark Avsec - keyboards, harmonica, background vocals 	
 Marty Lee Hoenes - rhythm and lead guitars, background vocals 	
 Albritton McClain - bass guitar, background vocals 	
 Kevin Valentine - drums, percussion

Additional musicians
 Dan McCarthy - horns on "Follow that Car"
 Rodney Psyka - percussion on "L.O.V.E."

Production
 Mark Avsec - producer (for Belkin-Maduri Organization)
 Carl Maduri - executive producer, recording and mixing engineer
 George Marino - mastering
 Marcia Resnick - cover photography
 Donna Scott (Modern Impressions Inc., Eastlake, Ohio) - jacket design
 Belkin Personal Management - management

CD re-issue personnel
 Marty Lee Hoenes - CD package design
 Francisco Rodriguez - digital remastering for CD
 Joe Woronka - stage manager
 Sue Farris - assistant, lyric transcriber

References

1985 albums
Donnie Iris albums
Albums produced by Mark Avsec